Paul Daniel King (born 25 February 1979) is an English cricketer.  King is a right-handed batsman who bowls and right-arm fast-medium.  He was born in Ipswich, Suffolk.

King made his debut for Suffolk in the 1997 Minor Counties Championship against Cambridgeshire.  King has played Minor counties cricket for Suffolk from 1997 to present, which has included 53 Minor Counties Championship appearances and 23 MCCA Knockout Trophy matches.  He made his List A debut against the Lancashire Cricket Board in the 2000 NatWest Trophy.  He made 3 further List A appearances, the last of which came against Glamorgan in the 2005 Cheltenham & Gloucester Trophy.  In his 4 List A matches, he scored 31 runs at an average of 15.50, with a high score of 15 not out.  With the ball, he took 2 wickets at a bowling average of 68.00, with best figures of 1/40.

References

External links
Paul King at ESPNcricinfo
Paul King at CricketArchive

1979 births
Living people
Cricketers from Ipswich
English cricketers
Suffolk cricketers